August Zirner (born 7 January 1956) is an American-Austrian actor, who starred in over 60 film productions. He is one of the most popular actors in Germany.

Biography
Zirner was born as son of Austrian Jewish immigrants in the United States in Urbana, Illinois. His father had fled from the Nazis.  In 1976 he studied drama at the Max Reinhardt Seminar in Vienna before he made his debut as an actor at the Volkstheater in Vienna. After that he was engaged in Hanover, Wiesbaden and at the Munich Kammerspiele. His breakthrough into film was in The Promise in 1994.

For the film Rage, he got the 2006 Grimme-Preis.

In 2009 Zirner played the transverse flute together with the Spardosen-Trio and the Theatre Program Diagnose: Jazz. In May 2011 Zirner acts in Blind Date, a play based on a film by Theo van Gogh at the Schauspielhaus Graz, a production of Bernadette Sonnenbichler.

Zirner is married to actress Katalin Zsigmondy and one of his four children is the actor Johannes Zirner. Although he has lived in Europe since 1973, August Zirner has retained his U.S. citizenship.

Commitment
August Zirner supports the Austrian Service Abroad as an advisor for the Austrian Holocaust Memorial Service.

Awards
2006 - "Special Recognition" by the German Academy of Performing Arts on the Film Festival Baden-Baden for the production team of Wut.

Selected filmography

1984:  (directed by ) .... Wolfgang
1986:  .... Paul
1988:  .... Luci's Husband
1989:  .... Lothar Fuchs
1990:  .... Yobo
1991: Von Gewalt keine Rede (TV Movie, directed by ) .... Frank Götz
1991: Voyager .... Joachim Hencke
1991: Forever Young (TV Movie) .... Tomy
1994: Du bringst mich noch um (directed by Wolfram Paulus) .... Simon Halm
1995: The Promise .... Konrad
1995: Talk of the Town .... Erik Kirsch
1996: Hannah (directed by Reinhard Schwabenitzky) .... Wolfgang Heck
1997: Der rote Schakal (TV Movie) .... Werner Leiser
1997: Der Wald (TV Movie, based on a novel by ) .... Karl Fürst
1997: The Pharmacist .... Pawel Siebert
1997: Winterkind (TV Movie, directed by Margarethe von Trotta) .... Michael
1998: Suzie Washington (directed by ) .... Herbert Korn
1999: Annaluise & Anton .... Richard Pogge
2000: Kissing My Sister .... Jan Lomberg
2001: Mostly Martha .... Martha's Therapist
2001: Taking Sides (directed by István Szabó) .... Captain Ed Martin
2001:  .... Herr Oberstein
2002: Amen. (directed by Costa-Gavras) .... Von Weizsäcker
2002: Joe and Max (TV Movie) .... David Lewin
2002: Gebürtig .... Danny Demant
2002:  (TV Movie, directed by Gernot Roll) .... König Friedrich II.
2003: Novaks Ultimatum (TV Movie) .... Dr. Günther Erhardt
2004:  (TV Mini-Series, directed by Rainer Kaufmann) .... Samuel Goldfisch
2004: Sergeant Pepper .... Dr. Theobald
2005: Speer und Er (TV Mini-Series) .... Dr. Gilbert
2005: Liebe nach dem Tod (TV Movie) .... Paul Markwart
2005: A Sound of Thunder .... Clay Derris
2005: Tara Road .... Greg Vine
2005: Der Todestunnel (TV Movie) .... Manfred Grabowski
2005: Mutig in die neuen Zeiten (TV Movie, directed by Harald Sicheritz) .... Paul Berkowitz
2006: Helen, Ted und Fred (TV Movie, directed by Sherry Hormann) .... Peter Kowalski
2006: Rage (TV Movie) .... Simon Laub
2007: The Counterfeiters .... Dr. Klinger
2007: Herr Bello .... Herr Sternheim / Traugott Sternheim
2007: Meine böse Freundin (TV Movie) .... Robert Mahrtaler
2007: Contergan – Eine einzige Tablette (TV Movie) .... Dr. Gerd Naumann
2008:  .... Richard Harms
2008: Ein starker Abgang (TV Movie) .... Dr. Kübler
2009:  (TV Movie) .... Dr. Borchert
2009:  (TV Movie) .... Dr. Martin Langhammer
2009: Dr. Hope – Eine Frau gibt nicht auf (TV Movie) .... Ludwig von Arnstetten
2009: Berlin 36 .... Edwin Bergmann
2009: Ein Dorf sieht Mord (TV Movie) .... Martin Selig
2009: So ein Schlamassel (TV Movie) .... Ludwig Norderstedt
2009: Meine Familie bringt mich um (TV Movie) .... Peter
2010: Klimawechsel (TV Series) .... Dr. Dieter Dumont
2010: The Last 30 Years (TV Movie) .... Oskar Landrock
2010: Ein Praktikant fürs Leben (TV Movie) .... Ulf Kamprath
2011: Der Kardinal (TV Movie) .... Franz König
2012: Sams im Glück .... Herr Oberstein
2012:  (TV Movie) .... Dr. Martin Langhammer
2012:  (TV Movie) .... August Staudenmeyer
2012: Die Lebenden .... Lenzi Weiss, Sitas Vater
2013:  .... Meier
2014:  (TV Movie) .... Alexander Halbach
2014:  (TV Movie) .... Philipp Immerwahr
2014: Coming In .... Salvatore
2015:  .... Georg
2015:  (TV Movie) .... Andreas Niethammer
2015: Colonia Dignidad .... German Ambassador
2017: Euphoria .... Frank
2018: Wackersdorf .... Innenminister
2018:  .... Maximilian
2018: Das Wunder von Wörgl .... Direktor Nationalbank
2018:  (TV Movie) .... Wilhelm Nolting-Hauff
2019: Das Ende der Wahrheit .... Dr. Grünhagen

References

External links
 

1956 births
20th-century American male actors
21st-century American male actors
20th-century Austrian male actors
21st-century Austrian male actors
American male film actors
American male television actors
American people of Austrian-Jewish descent
Austrian male film actors
Austrian male television actors
Austrian people of American descent
Living people
Male actors from Illinois